Viktor Olgyai, originally Viktor Matirko (1 November 1870, Igló - 20 June 1929, Salzburg) was a Hungarian painter and graphic artist. His family's name was changed in 1892.

Biography
His father was a retired district judge. When he was still a child, his family moved to Lőcse where he attended the public schools and began preparing for a career in the priesthood. He was then admitted to the seminary in Kassa and, as one of the best students there, was sent to study at the Pázmáneum in Vienna.

He returned to Lőcsé in 1890 and experienced a sort of epiphany while spending time in the nearby pine forests. He decided to take up drawing but, unable to achieve the desired effects with a pencil, turned to using a pen instead.

In 1891, he enrolled at the University of Budapest where he continued his linguistic and literary studies, but persevered with his drawing and sent one of sketch books to Artúr Tölgyessy, who encouraged him to pursue his interest in art. After a visit to Tölgyessy's studio in Margitta, and with the support of his brother Bertalan, he enrolled at the Academy of Fine Arts, Vienna and studied landscape painting with Eduard Peithner von Lichtenfels. He also took classes in etching from William Unger, which had a decisive influence on his work. He left the Academy in 1893 and began spending the winters with his family in Bacskó.

He became a lithographer and went to Besztercebánya in 1902, where he helped to create a literary and art magazine called "Havi Szemle" (Monthly Review), which he edited. His brother  was a major contributor. It was published for only three years. In 1906, he was invited to become head of the graphics department at the Hungarian University of Fine Arts. He remained in that position until his death and was active in the organization and administration of several professional art societies.

He committed suicide while vacationing in Austria. Shortly after, a major retrospective of his work was held at the Hall of Art.

References

External links 

 Arcadja Auctions: More works by Olgyai.
 Web umenia: works by Olgyai in Slovak galleries

1870 births
1929 deaths
Hungarian engravers
20th-century Hungarian painters
1929 suicides
Hungarian male painters
Suicides in Austria
20th-century Hungarian male artists
20th-century engravers